Herbert Charles "Skeeter" Eisele (July 15, 1904 – September 12, 1985) was an American football coach and college athletics administrator. He served as the head football coach at John Carroll University in University Heights, Ohio from 1947 to 1958, compiling a record of 60–36–5.

During his time at John Carroll, he coached future Pro Football Hall of Fame coach Don Shula and future National Football League (NFL) player and assistant coach Carl Taseff.

Eisele was born on July 15, 1904, in Pennsylvania. He graduated from Cathedral Latin School in Chardon, Ohio in 1922. He then attended the University of Dayton, where he played college football. Eisele later earned a master's degree from Western Reserve University. He died on September 12, 1985, at Ripon Memorial Hospital in Ripon, Wisconsin.

Head coaching record

References

External links
 

1904 births
1985 deaths
American football ends
Dayton Flyers football players
John Carroll Blue Streaks athletic directors
John Carroll Blue Streaks football coaches
High school football coaches in Ohio
Case Western Reserve University alumni
Coaches of American football from Ohio
Players of American football from Ohio